Scott House, also known as the Scott-Hauenstein House, is a historic home located at Kingstree, Williamsburg County, South Carolina.  It was built about 1843, and is a two-story, three bay, frame building, sheathed in weatherboard, with a side-gabled roof and brick foundation. The front façade features a "Carolina" or "rain porch." Its builder was Joseph Scott, a wealthy planter, trustee of the Kingstree Academy, and politician. It is the oldest on-site house in Kingstree.

It was listed in the National Register of Historic Places in 1982.

References

Houses on the National Register of Historic Places in South Carolina
Houses completed in 1843
Houses in Williamsburg County, South Carolina
National Register of Historic Places in Williamsburg County, South Carolina
1843 establishments in South Carolina